Grimes Airport  is a privately owned public-use airport located two nautical miles (3.7 km) east of the central business district of Bethel, in Berks County, Pennsylvania, United States.

The Golden Age of Aviation Museum is located at Grimes Airport. This organization focuses on pre-WW II aircraft.

Facilities and aircraft 
It has one runway designated 11/29 with a turf surface measuring 2,720 by 100 feet (829 x 30 m).

For the 12-month period ending May 14, 2009, the airport had 650 aircraft operations, an average of 54 per month: 92% general aviation and 8% military. At that time there were 17 aircraft based at this airport: 100% single-engine.

References

External links 
 Golden Age of Aviation Museum
 Grimes Airport (8N1) information from Pennsylvania DOT
 Aerial image as of 8 April 1999 from USGS The National Map

Airports in Pennsylvania
Transportation buildings and structures in Berks County, Pennsylvania